Guayaki may refer to:

Guayakis, a native tribe in eastern Paraguay
The Guayaki language
Guayakí (company), a beverage company